Magdalena Gómez is an American playwright, poet, social activist, motivational speaker, and performer. She lives in Springfield, Massachusetts where she is the artistic director of Teatro V!da, the first Latin@ theatre in Springfield, MA. Teatro V!da focuses on promoting youth leadership through the performing arts. Gómez is known for her multilingual works and dedication to creating art that can be understood by all, even those who are not multilingual. Gómez has worked with young people through the arts for nearly 40 years and focuses much of her work on intergenerational collaboration.

Biography 
Magdalena Gómez was born in New York City to a Spanish Gitano father and a Puerto Rican mother. Gómez's parents were not formally educated. Her father had only completed school to a second-grade level, but was fluent in three languages and proficient in five languages total, Spanish, English, Basque, Italian, and Portuguese. Gomez's father immigrated to the United States through Ellis Island at the age of 17. Despite her parents' lack of formal education, Gómez displayed academic ability from an early age. As a young girl, Gómez discovered Chinese poetry and the works of Ralph Waldo Emerson at her local library and has been interested in poetry and writing since then. Gómez cites her interest in writing and academics as something she discovered independently, as her schools were "more like prisons than centers of learning." Gómez first publicly performed her poetry at a burlesque house in Greenwich Village at age 17.

In the 1970s, Gómez taught drama at Johnny Colon’s East Harlem Music School. In 1982, she was the first volunteer theater director at Teatro El Puente in Williamsburg, NY. During her time there, the company became an HIV/AIDS and health issue educational touring company. Gómez was also a teaching artist and mentor for the Women of Color Leadership Network at University of Massachusetts, Amherst for ten years, from 1995-2005. She has been a teaching artist with SmART Schools Network since 1999. In 2007, Gómez cofounded Teatro V¡da, and in 2019, she became the Poet Laureate of Springfield, MA. A collection of her papers is housed at the University of Connecticut archives.

Teatro V!da 
Magdalena Gómez co-founded Teatro V!da, a performing arts collective that explores multicultural and multigenerational issues.  Founded in 2007, Teatro V!da uses many modes of communication and production to reach over 250,000 audience members in the years since it began. The theatre holds an open-mic program called Ign!te the M!c, which is a venue run by youth and for youth. The theatre is in the process of creating a production that combines live music and dancing with poetry in partnership with the Ferocious Women's Group, another program started by Magdalena Gómez.

Teatro V!da uses the phrase "the other TV" to describe the theatre, reflecting the idea that through theatre, members can create their own reality, apart from what is portrayed by popular media. Youth development and youth leadership are central to the theatre's mission, with their mission statement reading, "We encourage youth to strive for excellence in all facets of their lives with a spirit of generosity, non-violence and compassion." Through Teatro V!da, youth can build relationships with adult professionals for guidance in developing their own artistic pursuits and passions. Most of Teatro V!da's productions and events are generated directly by youth and incorporate multi-media production concepts.

Professional works and accomplishments 
Dancing in My Cockroach Killers (2013) is a performing arts piece consisting of a collection of Gómez's poems and monologues set to music by composer Desmar Guevara.

Bullying: Replies, Rebuttals, Confessions, and Catharsis (2012) is a book co-edited by Gómez that incorporates real stories from educators and students about their experiences with bullying. The collection of writings seeks to act as a method of healing for those impacted by bullying through the cathartic power of writing. The idea for the book resulted from the suicide of an 11-year-old boy who was the victim of bullying in Springfield, MA.

Shameless Woman (2014) is a memoir in poems written by Gómez. The poetry included in the book was composed over several decades, from the 1970s to the time the book was published. The book is divided into six sections: Shameless Woman, Family, To the Essence, The Invention of War, Lessons from the Dream World, and Endangered Species.

Language of Stars is a play written by Gómez starring a homeless man as the protagonist. The play won a Met-Life award from Repertorio Español in New York City.

Gómez is the founder of the Ferocious Women's Group, a group dedicated to promoting the voices of girls and women through writing and performing arts. The multi-generational Ferocious Women's Group meets regularly to support and empower each other, produce theatre, and mentor young women and girls.

Gómez is also known for her work as a jazz poet. She traveled and performed with her performance partner, jazz saxophonist Fred Ho for ten years.

Current projects 
Gómez is the artistic director of Teatro V!da. She is a commentator for the New England Public Radio and a columnist for the Point of View newspaper. In March 2020, Gómez created the podcast, Jazz Ready: 15 Minutes (more or less) of Unexpected Pleasure, in response to the COVID-19 pandemic. She also serves as Poet Laureate of Springfield, Massachusetts.

Awards and recognition 
 Poet Laureate of Springfield, MA – 2019-2021
 Latinas 50 Plus Literature Award, Fordham University - 2019
 Latinx Excellence on the Hill Award, Black and Latino Legislative Caucus of MA State House – 2019
 Excellence in the Arts Award, Springfield Cultural Council, Springfield, MA – 2018
 Arts and Humanities Award, New England Public Radio – 2018

See also 
 Latino theater in the United States
 Puerto Rican literature

References

External links
 Magdalena Gómez Papers at University of Connecticut

Living people
American dramatists and playwrights
Year of birth missing (living people)
Hispanic and Latino American dramatists and playwrights